The Associates is an American sitcom television series that aired on ABC from September 23, 1979 to April 17, 1980. Based on the novel of the same name by John Jay Osborn Jr., the series stars Wilfrid Hyde-White, Martin Short, Alley Mills, Joe Regalbuto, Shelley Smith, and Tim Thomerson. Despite being cancelled after nine of its thirteen episodes aired, it was nominated for two Golden Globe Awards and two Primetime Emmy Awards.

The Associates, from the producers of Taxi, was critically acclaimed in the fall of 1979. But, ABC-TV fell from its ratings perch that fall when they moved their schedule around. Mork & Mindy was moved to Sunday night to challenge CBS's 
most established night of the week. The Associates was scheduled to follow Mork as a promising new comedy series. Mork, however, was crushed by CBS's Archie Bunker's Place. ABC moved Mork back to Thursday, but it would never recover its ratings glory. One Day at a Time was the direct competition to The Associates. Meanwhile, The Associates was not given another chance and was canned by the network. The press heavily criticized ABC for not giving the show a chance in another time slot.

Synopsis
The show was the first bonafide starring vehicle for Short and centered on a small group of young novice lawyers who worked at a Wall Street law firm.  One of the creators of the series was John Jay Osborn, Jr., author of The Paper Chase. Episode seven featured guest star John Houseman reprising his role as Professor Kingsfield.

Cast
 Martin Short as Tucker Kerwin
 Joe Regalbuto as Eliot Streeter
 Tim Thomerson as Johnny Danko
 Alley Mills as Leslie Dunn
 Shelley Smith as Sara James
 Wilfrid Hyde-White as Emerson Marshall

Episodes

Syndication
The series had a complete run on BBC Two in the UK in 1982. The series was rerun on A&E in 1988, followed by runs on Comedy Central and TV Land in the 1990s.

In Italy, the series aired on Rete 4 as I novellini (Newbies) in 1982.

Award nominations

External links
 
 

1979 American television series debuts
1980 American television series endings
1970s American sitcoms
1980s American sitcoms
American Broadcasting Company original programming
1970s American legal television series
1970s American workplace comedy television series
1980s American legal television series
1980s American workplace comedy television series
English-language television shows
Television series by CBS Studios
Television shows set in New York City